Étienne Lalonde Turbide (sometimes Lalonde-Turbide, born 12 May 1989) is a Canadian fencer. At the 2012 Summer Olympics he competed in the Men's foil, but was defeated in the second round.

References

External links
 Étienne Lalonde-Turbide at Canada.com
 
 
 
 

1989 births
Living people
Canadian male fencers
Olympic fencers of Canada
Fencers at the 2012 Summer Olympics
Pan American Games silver medalists for Canada
Pan American Games bronze medalists for Canada
Pan American Games medalists in fencing
People from Verdun, Quebec
Sportspeople from Montreal
Fencers at the 2011 Pan American Games
Medalists at the 2011 Pan American Games
21st-century Canadian people